Ehmer is a surname. Notable people with the surname include:

Karl Ehmer(1906–1978), German footballer
Karl Ehmer (entrepreneur) (1909–1998), German-American businessman and philanthropist
Max Ehmer (born 1992), German footballer
Walter G. Ehmer (born  1967), American businessman
Wilhelm Ehmer (1896–1976), German poet